Denis D'Onofrio (born 3 July 1989 in Grugliasco) is an Italian professional football player currently playing for Viareggio.

He made his Serie A debut for Torino F.C. on 3 May 2009 in a game against ACF Fiorentina when he came on as a substitute in the 72nd minute for Blerim Džemaili. He made another Serie A appearance later in the 2008/09 season.

External links
 

1989 births
Living people
Italian footballers
Serie A players
Torino F.C. players
F.C. Esperia Viareggio players
Association football forwards
People from Grugliasco